Derek Gaston (born 18 April 1987) is a Scottish professional footballer who plays as a goalkeeper for Arbroath in the Scottish Championship. Gaston previously played for Albion Rovers before joining Morton in 2012.

Career
Gaston began his senior career with Albion Rovers in 2009, signing from local youth side Baillieston under-21s. He won the Scottish Football League player of the month award for September 2009.

He joined Greenock Morton in 2012, making his debut against his former club in the Challenge Cup in July 2012. After playing all but three matches for Morton in his first season, Gaston signed a new one-year contract in May 2013.

In May 2014, he agreed to sign for a further season, followed by signing another one-year deal in May 2015 after winning Scottish League One. Another contract renewal followed in October 2015, to tie him to Morton until 2018.

Gaston signed on for a seventh season at Cappielow in June 2018. He was released by Morton in the summer of 2019, having made over 200 appearances for the club.

On 4 June 2019, Gaston signed for newly promoted Scottish Championship club Arbroath. In his third season, Gaston earned 10 clean sheets in the opening 20 league games, thanks mostly to the work of Tam O'Brien and Ricky Little.

Personal life
As well as playing football, Gaston is also a lifeguard at the Time Capsule water park in Coatbridge, North Lanarkshire.

Career statistics

Honours
Morton
Scottish League One: Winners 2014–15

Individual
GMFC Player of the Year: 2014–15
SPFL Team of the Year: 2014–15
Scottish Football League Player of the Month: September 2009

See also
Greenock Morton F.C. season 2012–13 | 2013–14 | 2014–15 | 2015–16

References

External links

1987 births
Albion Rovers F.C. players
Association football goalkeepers
Greenock Morton F.C. players
Living people
Scottish Football League players
Scottish footballers
Scottish Professional Football League players
Footballers from Glasgow
Arbroath F.C. players